IM Pegasi is a variable binary star system approximately 329 light-years away in the constellation of Pegasus.  With an apparent magnitude of 5.7, it is visible to the naked eye.  Increased public awareness of it is due to its use as the guide star for the Gravity Probe B general relativity experiment.  It was chosen for this purpose because its microwave radio emissions are observable with a large radio telescope network on the ground in such a manner that its precise position can be related by interferometry to distant quasars.

The two components of the binary system includes a K-type giant star and a G-type main sequence star.  The primary star is estimated to be 1.8 times as massive and 13 times the diameter of the Sun.  The secondary star is estimated to be similar to the Sun in size and mass.  They orbit their common barycenter in a period precisely estimated to be 24.64877 days.

The variability of IM Pegasi is due to the active chromosphere of the giant primary star, which causes brightness changes of a few tenths of a magnitude as it rotates.

References

External links 
 A map of where IM Pegasi appears on the sky
 
 
 VLBI Imaging and Astrometric Results for IM Pegasi

Binary stars
G-type main-sequence stars
K-type giants
Pegasus (constellation)
RS Canum Venaticorum variables
Pegasi, IM
216489
8703
112997
Durchmusterung objects